Kristoffer Haraldseid (born 17 January 1994) is a Norwegian professional footballer who last played as a defender for Eliteserien club Molde.

Club career

Haugesund
Haraldseid was born in Haugesund. He made his senior debut for Haugesund on 27 August 2011 against Vålerenga; Haugesund lost 3–2.

Molde
On 2 February 2019, Haraldseid joined Molde. He signed a four-year contract with the club. He made his Molde debut on 31 March 2019 in a 1–1 away draw against Sarpsborg 08. On 12 May 2019, he scored his first goal for the club in Molde's 1–0 win at home against Mjøndalen. He got his 200th Eliteserien appearance in Molde's 2–1 win at home against Lillestrøm on 29 September 2019.

International career
Haraldseid played a total of 68 games and scored one goal for Norway at international youth level.

Career statistics

Honours
Eliteserien: 2019, 2022
Norwegian Cup: 2022

References

1994 births
Living people
People from Haugesund
Norwegian footballers
Eliteserien players
Association football defenders
FK Haugesund players
Molde FK players
People from Vindafjord
Sportspeople from Rogaland